Tumbling Shoals Creek is a  long 1st order tributary to the Reddies River in Wilkes County, North Carolina.  This is the only stream of this name in the United States.

Course
Tumbling Shoals Creek rises about 3 miles southwest of Halls Mills, North Carolina and then flows south-southwest to join the Reddies River at about 3 miles southeast of Wilbar, North Carolina.

Watershed
Tumbling Shoals Creek drains  of area, receives about 50.5 in/year of precipitation, has a wetness index of 253.51, and is about 88% forested.

References

Rivers of North Carolina
Bodies of water of Wilkes County, North Carolina